Wendon may refer to:

Wendon (town), in Waikaia Ward, Southland District, New Zealand
Luke Wendon (born 1926), British fencer
Nicholas Wendon, English clergyman Archdeacon of Suffolk 1559–1576; see List of Archdeacons of Suffolk

See also
Wenden (disambiguation)
Michael Wenden (born 1949), Australian swimmer